Yunzhou or Yun Zhou may refer to:

 Yunzhou Township, a town in Chicheng County, Hebei, China
 Yunzhou (modern Shanxi), a prefecture between the 7th and 11th centuries in modern Shanxi, China
 Yunzhou (modern Shandong), a prefecture between the 6th and 12th centuries in modern Shandong, China

See also
Zhou Yun (actress) (born 1978), Chinese actress surnamed Zhou
Zhou Yun (footballer) (born 1990), Chinese footballer surnamed Zhou
 Yun (disambiguation)
 Zhou (disambiguation)